Carrément à l'Ouest is a 2001 French comedy drama directed and written by Jacques Doillon. It was screened in the Un Certain Regard section at the 2001 Cannes Film Festival.

Cast
Lou Doillon as  Fred 
Caroline Ducey as  Silvia 
Guillaume Saurrel as  Alex 
Camille Clavel as  François, the student 
Xavier Villeneuve as  Xavier, Alex's brother 
Hafed Benotman as  Ben, François's friend 
Joshua Phillips as  Hotel clerk 
Antoine Chain as  Customer 
Arthur Chain as  Hotel bellboy 
Aurore Giradolle as  Girl in night-club 
Hervé Duhamel as  Cash machine customer 
Hassan Dramé as  18 Arrondissement boy

References

External links

Carrément à l'Ouest at Films de France

2000s French-language films
2001 comedy-drama films
2001 films
Films directed by Jacques Doillon
Films produced by Marin Karmitz
French comedy-drama films
2000s French films